Taski Etoka (also Mingatuska, Tuskeatoka) (died 1794)  was a Native American (Chickasaw) leader of the mid-1780s. He was signator (along with Piominko and Lotapaia), of the  Treaty of Hopewell in January 1786.

Taski Etoka was succeeded by Selocta Chinnabby, his brother.

References

1794 deaths
18th-century Native Americans
Chickasaw people
Native American leaders
Year of birth unknown